The 1952–53 Buffalo Bulls men's basketball team represented the University of Buffalo during the 1952–53 NCAA college men's basketball season. The head coach was Malcolm S. Eiken, coaching his seventh season with the Bulls.

Schedule

|-

References

Buffalo Bulls men's basketball seasons
Buffalo
Buffalo Bulls
Buffalo Bulls